This article describes the demographics of Munich via tables and graphs.

Population growth 

The population of Munich was only 24,000 in 1700, but it doubled every 30 years, and in 1852 the population exceeded 100,000, qualifying it a large city (Großstadt) by German administrative standards. By 1883, Munich had a population of 250,000; this doubled to 500,000 in 1901, making Munich the third largest city in the Deutsches Reich after Berlin and Hamburg.

The physical effects of the Second World War are clearly visible. Towards the end of the war, 90% of the historical old town had been destroyed in 73 aerial raids and half of the city was in ruins. Estimates for the impact of these raids on the population offer the figure of 6,000 dead. In total, Munich lost 34% of its population, with 279,000 people displaced through evacuation, migration, deportation, and made homeless through aerial attacks. The total population decreased from 829,000 in May 1939 to 550,000 in May 1945. The prewar population level was not regained until 1950.

Shortly before the city's 800th anniversary, on 15 December 1957, the millionth resident of Munich was born, making Munich the latest city to reach a population of one million out of 70 cities worldwide. According to the Bavarian National Office for Statistics and Data Processing, the official figure for the population of Munich was 1,259,677 in December 2005 (only principal residences and with adjustments from other national offices). , it stood at 1,305,525.

The following summary shows the population according to historical local data. Up to 1824 the figures are mainly estimates; after that they are census results or official statistics from the local authorities. From 1871 onward, the figures given refer to the "population present in the town (ortsanwesende Bevölkerung); from 1925 the figures are the "resident population" (Wohnbevölkerung), and from since 1987 the figures are for the "population at the place of main residence" (Bevölkerung am Ort der Hauptwohnung). Before 1871, figures are from irregular survey methods.

From 1369 to 1944 

¹ Census figures

From 1945 to 1989 

¹ Census figures

From 1990 

¹ Census figures

Source: Bavarian Regional Authority for Statistics and Data Handling (Bayerisches Landesamt für Statistik und Datenverarbeitung).

Population forecast 

The Bertelsmann Foundation provides data for population and population growth for 2,959 municipalities in Germany (January 2006 publication). In Munich, the population is forecast to rise by 7.8% between 2003 and 2020 (96,988 persons).

Projected population growth 2003–2020 for Munich (principal residences):

Source: Bertelsmann Foundation

In the city administration's 2002 planning forecast, a 2% rise of the legally resident population (principal and secondary residences) between 2001 and 2015 is predicted. For immigration, a 7.2% rise is predicted and for stagnation, a decrease of 1.7%.
Absolute population trend 2001–2015 – Forecast for Munich (principal and secondary residences):

Source: Munich Statistical Office (Statistisches Amt der Landeshauptstadt München).

Population structure 

In December 2005, the proportion of foreigners was 23.3% or 300,129 persons in absolute figures. The largest groups of these are Turks (43.309), Croatians (24,866), Serbians (24,439), Greeks (22,486), Austrians (21,411) and Italians (20,847). 37% of foreigners in Munich come from countries within the European Union.

Source: Munich Statistical Office (Statistisches Amt der Landeshauptstadt München).

Age distribution 

The following shows the age distribution from 31 December 2005 (principal residences).

Source: Munich Statistical Office (Statistisches Amt der Landeshauptstadt München).

Boroughs 

The following number of inhabitants refer to principal residences as of 31 December 2006.

Source: Munich Statistical Office (Statistisches Amt der Landeshauptstadt München).

Foreign communities
There are very sizable Balkan and Turkish communities in the city. Of the foreign nationals in Munich, about 37% come from the European Union. The most common foreign nationals in Munich are:

Data for the year 2021:
 Croats (38.859)
 Turks (37.614)
 Italians (28.137)
 Greeks (25.897)
 Bosnians (22.512)
 Austrians (20.118)
 Romanians (17.932)
 Poles (17.839)
 Serbs (14.484)
 Bulgarians (13.646)

Bavarian State Office for Statistics

See also 

History of Munich 
Mayors of Munich
Demographics of Berlin
Demographics of Cologne
Demographics of Hamburg

Literature 

Kaiserliches Statistisches Amt (Hrsg.): Statistisches Jahrbuch für das Deutsche Reich, 1880–1918 
Statistisches Reichsamt (Hrsg.): Statistisches Jahrbuch für das Deutsche Reich, 1919-1941/42 
Deutscher Städtetag (Hrsg.): Statistisches Jahrbuch Deutscher Gemeinden , 1890 ff. 
Statistisches Bundesamt (Hrsg.): Statistisches Jahrbuch für die Bundesrepublik Deutschland, 1952 ff.

Data sources 

History of Munich
Munich
Munich